Modern Mothers is a 1928 American silent drama film, directed by Phil Rosen. It stars Helene Chadwick, Douglas Fairbanks Jr., and Ethel Grey Terry, and was released on May 13, 1928.

Cast list
 Helene Chadwick as Adele Dayton
 Douglas Fairbanks Jr. as David Starke
 Ethel Grey Terry as Mazie
 Barbara Kent as Mildred
 Alan Roscoe as John
 Gene Stone as Gilbert
 George Irving as Theater manager

References

External links 
 
 
 

American silent feature films
1928 drama films
1928 films
Silent American drama films
Films directed by Phil Rosen
Columbia Pictures films
American black-and-white films
1920s English-language films
1920s American films